Coleophora helichrysiella is a moth of the family Coleophoridae. It is found in Europe south of the line running from France to North Macedonia and Romania.

The larvae feed on Helichrysum italicum and Helichrysum stoechas. They create a two-valved, black silken sheath case. The rear end is narrowed, pointed, and lightly bent downwards. The mouth angle is about 45°. Full-grown cases can be found in May.

References

helichrysiella
Moths of Europe